2015 Pac-12 Conference Tournament may refer to:
2015 Pac-12 Conference men's basketball tournament
2015 Pac-12 Conference women's basketball tournament